Aleksey/Alexey/Alexei Saltykov may refer to:

Alexey Saltykov (director) (1934–1993), Soviet and Russian film director
Alexey Saltykov (1806–1859), Russian traveller, writer and artist
 , Governor of Moscow (1713–1716) and Governor of Kazan (1719–1725)

See also
Saltykov, a Russian masculine surname